is a Japanese football player who plays for Gamba Osaka in the J1 League.   He has previously played for both Urawa Red Diamonds and Fagiano Okayama.   His regular playing position is midfielder.

Club career

Born and raised in the Urawa area of Saitama, Yajima came through the ranks with his local team Urawa Red Diamonds and joined their first team ahead of the 2012 season aged just 18.   He made just a solitary appearance in the Emperor's Cup during his debut season as a professional, but the following year he earned more game time; playing 8 times in the league and 6 in the domestic cups where he found the back of the net 3 times.   The next 2 seasons with Urawa saw him struggle to get on the pitch and he appeared just 7 and 6 times respectively in all competitions.

Owing to a lack of game time, Yajima was sent on a 2-season loan to J2 League side Fagiano Okayama in 2015.   He immediately became a regular in their midfield and played 37 league games in both of his seasons with Okayama scoring 13 times in total as they finished 11th and 6th in the final standings.

After gaining good top-team experience in J2 it was back to Urawa for 2017 and although he featured more than he had done prior to moving to Okayama, he was still rather a peripheral figure at the Saitama Stadium.   He made just 11 appearances in the league and 19 in total, including 4 in Urawa's victorious AFC Champions League campaign.

Yajima moved from Urawa to their fierce rivals Gamba Osaka ahead of the 2018 season. However, he was not flavour of the month with new Brazilian coach Levir Culpi and played a mere 2 league and 2 league cup games in his first year in Osaka.   Out of favour, he found himself featuring as an overage player for Gamba Under-23 in J3 League under the leadership of Tsuneyasu Miyamoto.   He played 9 times in J3 before being loaned to J1 side Vegalta Sendai at the end of June.

Game time was again hard to come by in Sendai and he played just 5 league games and 3 Emperor's Cup games as Vegalta finished runners up to his former club, Urawa.   Tsuneyasu Miyamoto replaced Levir Culpi midway through the 2018 season with Gamba facing the real prospect of relegation to J2, he steadied the ship and was appointed as head coach permanently ahead of the 2019 campaign.   Having worked with Yajima previously at Gamba Under-23, he recalled him to first team squad ahead of his first full season in charge at the Panasonic Stadium.

National team career

In August 2016, Yajima was selected in the Japan Under-23 national team squad for the 2016 Summer Olympics. At this tournament, he played all 3 matches and scored a goal against Sweden.

Club statistics
Updated to 10 December 2018.

1Includes Emperor's Cup.
2Includes J. League Cup.
3Includes Japanese Super Cup, J2 playoffs and FIFA Club World Cup.

Reserves performance

Honours

International
Last Updated: 7 February 2019
Japan U-23
 AFC U-23 Championship: 2016

Club
Urawa Red Diamonds
AFC Champions League: 2017

References

External links

1994 births
Living people
Association football people from Saitama Prefecture
Japanese footballers
Japan youth international footballers
J1 League players
J2 League players
J3 League players
Urawa Red Diamonds players
Fagiano Okayama players
J.League U-22 Selection players
Gamba Osaka players
Gamba Osaka U-23 players
Vegalta Sendai players
Omiya Ardija players
Footballers at the 2014 Asian Games
Footballers at the 2016 Summer Olympics
Olympic footballers of Japan
Association football midfielders
Asian Games competitors for Japan